Adwa Pan-African University 
() is a higher education institution under construction in Adwa, Tigray, Ethiopia. The University is named after the historically significant 1896 Battle of Adwa.

Emperor Hailesilasi was the first to propose the establishment of a Pan-African university. Where he said future African leaders would be groomed. He actually offered facilities to host a Pan-African university and proposed the African Standby Force in the form of common defense against colonial type interventions.

References 

Universities and colleges in Ethiopia
Tigray Region
Educational institutions established in 2017
2017 establishments in Ethiopia